Skybaby or Sky baby may refer to:

Fisher FP-606 Sky Baby, ultralight aircraft
Skyhigh Skybaby, ultralight aircraft
Stits SA-2A Sky Baby 1952 home built aircraft considered one of the world's smallest.